Nokia 8210 is a mobile phone by Nokia, announced on 8 October 1999 in Paris. At the time, it was the smallest, lightest Nokia mobile phone on the market, thus its selling point was based on its design and customization, with removable Xpress-on covers. Six differently coloured Xpress-on covers are available, as well as many third-party ones.

Nokia 8210 uses the GSM 900/1800 band, supports the Extended GSM 900 band (EGSM), and can automatically switch between bands.

Specifications

Design
The phone weighs 79 g (with a lithium battery) and is 101.5 mm long, 44.5 mm wide and 17.4 mm thick. It has a green frontlit monochrome display (the keypad is also illuminated green).

The volume has ten levels, and is controlled via a grey button on the top left side of the phone. The base of the phone contains the charger and headset connector.

Call management
The phone has a speed dial feature, in which the user can assign a name to each key on the keypad (except key 1, which is used for calling voicemail). Voice dialing can also be used by assigning up to 8 voice tags to a name. Dialed, received, and missed calls are all registered, and calls can be diverted.

Messaging
The phone uses SMS (Short Message Service) with predictive text input, with support for major European languages. Messages can be up to 160 characters long. Compatible handsets can send and receive OTA bitmap picture messages (not MMS).

Memory
The device's memory can store up to 250 names. Alternately, a SIM card can be used to store names (although memory capacity is specific to each SIM card). The calendar can store up to 50 notes.

Infrared
Nokia 8210 features an infrared port on the lower left side, which can be used to communicate with a compatible PC or printer. The infrared port can also be used to transfer names and phone numbers or business cards between compatible phones. Data is transferred at 9.6 kilobits per second.

The infrared connection can also be used to play two-player Snake with another supported phone.

Games
The phone has four games: Memory, Snake, Logic and Rotation. The infrared connection can be used to play two-way Snake with a compatible device.

Issues
The Nokia "82XX" series had several design flaws, among them a tendency to develop "screen fade", in which the connector for the display would shrink, and figures on the display would become so dim that it was impossible to read them.

Variants

GSM variants – Nokia 8250 and 8290
Available in the first quarter of 2001, Nokia 8250 is a variant of Nokia 8210 designed for Asian Pacific markets, sporting a slightly different design and a blue backlight, as well as EGSM (Extended GSM) support. It has a ringtone composer, and supports downloadable personal profiles, including ringtones and screensavers.

Another GSM version of Nokia 8210 is Nokia 8290, designed for the North American market using single-band GSM-1900.

D-AMPS (TDMA)/AMPS – Nokia 8260, 8265, and 8265i
Nokia 8260 is a variant of the 8290 designed for IS-136 "TDMA"/AMPS networks in North America. The 8260, weighing 3.4 ounces, is slightly heavier and larger than the 8290 at 2.8 ounces. Unlike the 8290, the 8260 does not feature voice dialing, an infrared port, or officially interchangeable faceplates.

Nokia 8265 is an updated version of the 8260, sporting an updated design. New features include picture messaging and a white backlight. Nokia 8265i adds a WAP browser and switches to a blue backlight.

CDMA2000 – Nokia 8270
Nokia 8270 is a related CDMA2000 model with a similar design to the Asian-market Nokia 8250. It operates on the CDMA2000 1900 frequency.  Like the 8250, the 8270 features a blue backlight. However, it does not feature an infrared port. In its time, this phone was a great hit with many people. It had a cult status in the early 2000s Australia and New Zealand due to its size and backlight, and was known for this as "Nokia-Blue".

Reception and legacy

Nokia 8210 continued to be in popular demand well into 2010s by people who want a small phone with long battery life, but with no modern non-mobile connectivity that could be used for tracking, such as the mobile Internet, Wi-Fi, Bluetooth, and NFC. The only wireless option is infrared, allowing for an easy exchange of contacts between compatible devices. As a result, Nokia 8210 and like models command a greater price in the aftermarket.

Nokia 8210 4G
On 12 July 2022, HMD Global announced an updated version of Nokia 8210, the Nokia 8210 4G. The new 8210 supports 4G networks, has a 2.8 inch colour display, 1 GHz CPU, expandable storage, a 0.3 MP camera, and Bluetooth connectivity.

References

8210
Mobile phones introduced in 1999
Mobile phones with infrared transmitter